Avaste Nature Reserve is a nature reserve situated in western Estonia, to largest extent in Pärnu County.

Avaste nature reserve consists of forests, fens, bogs and meadows. It is centred on Avaste fen, one of the largest fens in Estonia. The flora of the nature reserve includes sweet gale, mud sedge and several species of orchid. Several species of rare or threatened birds furthermore have a habitat in the nature reserve. These include black stork, white-backed woodpecker, northern goshawk, short-eared owl, three species of eagle and others.

References

Nature reserves in Estonia
Wetlands of Estonia
Lääneranna Parish
Põhja-Pärnumaa Parish
Märjamaa Parish